Verheyden is a surname. Notable people with the surname include:

 Isidore Verheyden (1846–1905), Belgian painter
 Mattheus Verheyden (1700–1776), Dutch painter
 Wim Verheyden (born 1967), Belgian-Flemish politician

See also
 Verheiden
 Verheijen